Janette Husárová and Elena Likhovtseva were the defending champions, but Husárová did not participate. Likhovtseva participated with Vera Zvonareva, but the pair lost in the semifinals to Conchita Martínez and Virginia Ruano Pascual.

Gisela Dulko and Květa Peschke won the title, defeating Martínez and Ruano Pascual in the final 6–2, 6–3.

Seeds

Draw

Draw

Qualifying

Seeds

Qualifiers

  Yuliana Fedak /  Elena Vesnina

Draw

References
 Main and Qualifying Draws (ITF)

Generali Ladies Linz - Doubles